Milorad Krivokapić may refer to:

 Milorad Krivokapić (handballer) (born 1980), Serbian-Hungarian handballer 
 Milorad Krivokapić (water polo) (born 1956), Montenegrin water polo player